"Bullets" is the debut single by British post-punk revival band Editors, originally released 24 January 2005. It is from their 2005 debut album, The Back Room. The single was mixed by Cenzo Townshend and the video made for the song was directed by Mike Brady. Both editions of the original single were limited to 500 copies. It was then re-released on 26 September 2005 as the fourth single from the album. A new single version was re-recorded and produced by Jacknife Lee and a second video was made for the song, directed by Martin de Thurah.

Track listings
 7-inch (SKX77)
 "Bullets"
 "You Are Fading"

 CD (SKCD77)
 "Bullets"
 "You Are Fading"
 "Dust in the Sunlight"

Track listings (re-issue)
 7-inch (SKX80)
 "Bullets" (Jack Knife Lee Remix)
 "Time to Slow Down"

 CD (SKCD802)
 "Bullets" (Jack Knife Lee Remix)
 "Come Share the View"

 Maxi-CD (SKCD80)
 "Bullets" (Jack Knife Lee Remix)
 "I Buried the Devil"
 "Blood" (alternative version)
 "Bullets" (new video)

References

2005 songs
2005 debut singles
Editors (band) songs
Song recordings produced by Jim Abbiss
Songs written by Chris Urbanowicz
Songs written by Edward Lay
Songs written by Russell Leetch
Songs written by Tom Smith (musician)